Santiago Esteva (born 16 July 1952) is a Spanish former backstroke, freestyle and medley swimmer who competed in the 1968 Summer Olympics and in the 1976 Summer Olympics.

References

1952 births
Living people
Spanish male medley swimmers
Spanish male freestyle swimmers
Spanish male backstroke swimmers
Male medley swimmers
Olympic swimmers of Spain
Swimmers at the 1968 Summer Olympics
Swimmers at the 1976 Summer Olympics
European Aquatics Championships medalists in swimming
Swimmers at the 1971 Mediterranean Games
Swimmers at the 1975 Mediterranean Games
Mediterranean Games gold medalists for Spain
Mediterranean Games medalists in swimming